Osip (Russian О́сип) is a Russian male given name, a variant of the name Joseph. Notable people with the name include:

 Osip Abdulov (1900–1953), Soviet actor
 Osip Aptekman, Russian revolutionary
 Ossip Bernstein (1882–1962), Russian-French chess player
 Osip Bilchansky (1858–1879), Russian terrorist hanged for using a gun to resist arrest
 Osip Bodyansky (1808–1877), Russian Imperial Slavist of Ukrainian Cossack descent
 Osip Braz (1873–1936), Russian-Jewish realist painter
 Osip Brik, Russian writer and literary critic, a futurist
 Osip Dymov (writer), pseudonym for Yosif (Osip) Isidorovich Perelman (1878-1959), Russian writer
 Osip Gelfond (1868–1942), Russian physician and Marxist philosopher
 Osip Komissarov, hatter's apprentice famous for thwarting the assassination of Alexander II of Russia
 Osip Kozodavlev (1754–1819), Russian statesman, politician and Minister of the Interior
 Osip Mikhailovich Lerner (1847–1907), also known as Y. Y. (Yosef Yehuda) Lerner, a 19th-century Russian Jewish intellectual, writer and critic
 Osip Mandelstam, Russian poet
 Osip Minor (1861–1932), Russian revolutionary and member of the Socialist-Revolutionary Party
 Osip Notovich, Russian author, journalist and publisher
 Osip Petrov (1806–1878), Russian operatic bass-baritone
 Osip Piatnitsky (1882–1938), Russian revolutionary
 Osip Senkovsky, Polish-Russian journalist
 Osip Sorokhtei (1890–1941), Ukrainian painter, graphic artist, caricaturist and art teacher
 Osip Startsev, Russian architect
 Osip Ivanovich Somov (1815–1876), Russian mathematician
 Osip Yermansky (1867–1941), Russian economist

See also
 oSIP, a free software library for VoIP applications implementing lower layers of Session Initiation Protocol (SIP)
 Osip Dymov, central fictional character in the classic Russian story "The Grasshopper" (1892) by Anton Chekhov
 Osipov /  Osipova (feminine) / Ossipoff

Russian masculine given names

ru:Осип